Lockett v. Ohio, 438 U.S. 586 (1978), is a United States Supreme Court case in which the Court held that sentencing authorities must have the discretion to consider at least some  mitigating factors, rather than being limited to a specific list of factors.

Background
An Ohio law required that the death penalty was mandatory for felons convicted of aggravated murder unless the victim had induced the offense, the offense was committed under duress or coercion, or the offense was a product of mental deficiencies. Sandra Lockett, the driver of the getaway car for a robbery that resulted in the murder of a pawnshop owner, was found guilty under the Ohio statute and sentenced to death.

Question before the Court
Does the Ohio statute requiring the death penalty for felons convicted of aggravated murder violate the Eighth and Fourteenth Amendments by limiting the consideration of mitigating factors?

Opinion of the Court
With a 7-1 decision in favor of Lockett, Justice Burger wrote the opinion for the majority. The Court held that the Eighth and Fourteenth Amendments required, in all but the rarest cases, that sentencers consider all mitigating factors surrounding the accused murderer before coming to the decision of applying the death penalty. These mitigating factors include, "a defendant's character or record and any circumstances of the offense proffered as a reason for a sentence less than death." Justice Burger, joined by Justice Stewart, Justice Powell and Justice Stevens concluded that "the limited range of mitigating circumstances that may be considered by the sentencer under the Ohio death penalty statute is incompatible with the Eighth and Fourteenth Amendments." The Court cited  Gregg, when the Court had previously approved of a statute that permitted the jury to "consider any aggravating or mitigating circumstances" to support their decision in Lockett

Justice Blackmun's concurrence
Justice Blackmun agreed with the majority of the opinion written by the Chief Justice, however he "would do so for a reason more limited than that which the plurality espouses, and for an additional reason not relied upon by the plurality."

Justice Marshall's concurrence
In a separate special concurrence from Justice Blackmun, Justice Marshall noted his opposition of the death penalty on its face, and deemed it a form of cruel and unusual punishment in violation of the Eighth Amendment of the Constitution.  Justice Marshall notes that "when a death sentence is imposed under the circumstances presented here, I fail to understand how any of my Brethren -- even those who believe that the death penalty is not wholly inconsistent with the Constitution -- can disagree that it must be vacated."

See also
 List of United States Supreme Court cases, volume 438

References

External links
 

1978 in United States case law
United States Supreme Court cases
United States Supreme Court cases of the Burger Court
Cruel and Unusual Punishment Clause and death penalty case law
United States Fifth Amendment self-incrimination case law
United States Sixth Amendment jury case law
Capital punishment in Ohio